All or Nothing is the third and final  studio album from Christian band Mikeschair, which it is produced by Matt Bronleewe, David Garcia, Ben Glover, Jason Ingram and Rusty Varenkamp, and the album released on April 1, 2014 by Curb Records.

Critical reception

All or Nothing garnered generally positive reception from the ratings and reviews of music critics. Matt Conner of CCM Magazine rated the album three stars out of five, commenting how the release contains "great melodies" like their past works, and that they should be "destined for further radio success". At New Release Tuesday, Jonathan Francesco rated the album four-and-a-half stars out of five, writing that the band "have crafted another winner". Jonathan Andre of Indie Vision Music rated the album four stars out of five, stating how the album is "powerful, poignant and provoking". Louder Than the Music's Jono Davies rated the album a perfect five stars, remarking how "This pop/rock album is pop/rock at its best" that is the reason why according to him it "is an instant classic." At Jesus Freak Hideout, David Craft rated the album two stars out of five, saying that "Not much stands out", but this release is "an acceptable album": however, the release "does little but add more noise to an already swamped genre."

Commercial performance
For the Billboard charting week of April 19, 2014, All or Nothing was the No. 20 Christian Album sold and it was the No. 10 Top Heatseekers Album sold.

Track listing

Chart positions

References

2014 albums
Mikeschair albums
Curb Records albums
Albums produced by Matt Bronleewe